Hierges is a commune in the Ardennes department in the Grand Est region in northern France.

Hierges is located in the Meuse valley along the Belgian border.

Population

Sights and monuments
 Château de Hierges, a castle whose origins go back to the 16th century, was built on the site of an earlier 9th century castrum.

See also
Manasses of Hierges
Héribrand II of Hierges
Communes of the Ardennes department

References

Communes of Ardennes (department)
Ardennes communes articles needing translation from French Wikipedia